The 1957 Ball State Cardinals football team was an American football team that represented Ball State Teachers College (later renamed Ball State University) in the Indiana Collegiate Conference (ICC) during the 1957 NCAA College Division football season. In its second season under head coach Jim Freeman, the team compiled a 2–5–1 record (2–3–1 against ICC opponents) and finished in fourth place out of seven teams in the ICC.

Schedule

References

Ball State
Ball State Cardinals football seasons
Ball State Cardinals football